The 2012–13 Elitserien season was the 38th season of Elitserien. The regular season began on 13 September 2012 and ended on 5 March 2013. The playoffs began on 12 March 2013 and ended on 18 April 2013. The 2012–13 Elitserien season was the last season under the name "Elitserien"; on 17 June 2013, the league was renamed "Swedish Hockey League" (SHL).

Skellefteå AIK clinched the Swedish Championship for the first time since 1978, defeating Luleå HF 4–0 in the Finals. It was the team's second Swedish Championship in club history. Skellefteå also won the regular season for the first time since the 1980–81 season, and the second time in club history. Their 114-point finish is the highest number of points since Färjestad BK won the 2001–02 regular season with 118 points. Luleå HF improved on the record for fewest goals surrendered in a 55-game regular season that they set last season by only having 102 goals scored against them.

In Kvalserien, Örebro HK (first SHL season) and Leksands IF qualified for the 2013–14 SHL season at the expense of Timrå IK and Rögle BK.

Participating teams 

Note: Frölunda HC played their final three home games of the regular season in Frölundaborg, which had a smaller capacity of 7,600 spectators.

Summary

Short-term contracts
Short-term contracts and the possibility of signing players affected by the 2012–13 NHL lockout was a controversial issue for several months. The board of hockey operations for Elitserien (Hockeyligan) decided to continue rejecting short-term contracts (i.e. contracts not lasting for the entire season) on 23 August 2012. On 21 September 2012, the Swedish Competition Authority (SCA) examined the matter and responded with a ruling that allowed short-term contracts. Hockeyligan appealed the SCA ruling to the Market Court. On 18 December 2012, the Market Court ruled against the SCA and allowed Hockeyligan to forbid short-term contracts. The uncertainty and concerns of legal punishment caused a number of Elitserien clubs to refrain from signing short-term contracts and await the Market Court's decision. In the end, Cody Franson played 26 Elitserien games with Brynäs, Alexander Steen played 20 games with Modo, and Matt Duchene played 19 games and Viktor Stålberg 11 games with Frölunda before their short-term contracts expired.

Outdoor game
For the fourth consecutive season, an outdoor game was played. As part of Brynäs IF celebrating their 100th year as a club, they hosted Timrå IK on December 8, 2012, in a temporary arena called Gävlebocken ("Gävle Goat") Arena. Brynäs won the game 3–0 in front of 15,009 spectators.

Decline in attendance
The average attendance in Elitserien fell by 10.5% from 6,385 to 5,717 spectators per game, the lowest average since the 2002–03 season. The drop meant that Elitserien was fifth in average attendance among professional ice hockey leagues (fourth in Europe) – after the NHL, NLA, DEL and KHL. In the 2011–12 season, Elitserien had the second highest average attendance among professional hockey leagues (first in Europe).

There were several reasons for the decline; Frölunda HC saw an 18.1% decrease to an average of 8,588 fans per game. The second most attended team last season, Djurgårdens IF, was relegated to HockeyAllsvenskan. Nine of the eleven returning teams from last season had lower attendance numbers, with Skellefteå AIK and Luleå HF being the only teams to increase their average attendance. HockeyAllsvenskan, on the other hand, improved its attendance average this season from 2,606 to 3,227 spectators per game, an improvement of 23.8% from the 2011–12 season.

Regular season

Standings

Statistics

Scoring leaders 
 
Updated as of the end of the regular season.
GP = Games played; G = Goals; A = Assists; Pts = Points; +/– = Plus/minus; PIM = Penalty minutes

Leading goaltenders 
These are the leaders in GAA among goaltenders who have played at least 40% of the team's minutes. Updated as of the end of the regular season.

GP = Games played; TOI = Time on ice (minutes); GA = Goals against; SO = Shutouts; Sv% = Save percentage; GAA = Goals against average

Regular season attendance

Playoffs

Playoff bracket 
In the first round, the highest remaining seed chose which of the four lowest remaining seeds to be matched against. In the second round, the highest remaining seed is matched against the lowest remaining seed. In each round the higher-seeded team is awarded home ice advantage. Each best-of-seven series follows an alternating home team format: the higher-seeded team will play at home for games 1 and 3 (plus 5 and 7 if necessary), and the lower-seeded team will be at home for game 2, 4 and 6 (if necessary).

Quarterfinals

(1) Skellefteå AIK vs. (8) Brynäs IF

(2) Färjestad BK vs. (7) Modo Hockey

(3) Luleå HF vs. (6) Frölunda HC

(4) HV71 vs. (5) Linköpings HC

Semifinals

(1) Skellefteå AIK vs. (5) Linköpings HC
Skellefteå won the series 4–1 and advanced to the Finals for the third year in a row, becoming the first team to achieve this feat since HV71 between 2008–2010.

(2) Färjestad BK vs. (3) Luleå HF
Luleå won the series 4–1 and advanced to the Finals for the first time since winning the Swedish Championship in 1996.
Linus Persson's game-deciding goal in Game 4, 12 seconds into overtime, is a new record for the fastest overtime goal scored in Elitserien playoff history.

Finals: (1) Skellefteå AIK vs. (3) Luleå HF 

The Finals became a matchup between the league's two northernmost teams: Skellefteå and Luleå. Skellefteå won three of the five regular-season games against Luleå; two of the five games had to be decided in a shootout. This was only the second playoff series between these two teams; in 2011, Skellefteå defeated Luleå in six games to advance to the Finals (where they eventually lost). This was Skellefteå's third consecutive Finals appearance (Skellefteå reached the Finals in 2011 and 2012), and their fourth overall excluding seasons before Elitserien was formed. Luleå made their first Finals appearance since losing the Swedish Championship to Färjestad three games to one in 1997, as well as their third appearance overall (Luleå became Swedish Champions in 1996).

Skellefteå won the series 4–0, and became Swedish champions for the first time since 1978, and only the second time in club history. Luleå became the first team since 2003 to get swept in the Finals, in four straight games. Skellefteå finished the playoffs with a 12–1 record, the best playoff record since Färjestad's playoff run in 2009.

In Game 4, Skellefteå clinched the Swedish Championship with a 4–0 shutout over Luleå. Goaltender Joacim Eriksson stopped all 32 shots against Skellefteå's crease. After the first period, Skellefteå was up 2–0, following goals by Oscar Möller at 3:33 and Erik Forssell at 15:22. 5:32 into the second period, Johan Forsberg netted his first goal of the playoffs to give Skellefteå a three-goal lead. With less than four minutes to go in the third period, Erik Forssell sealed the Swedish Championship for Skellefteå with an empty netter, his second goal of the game.

Statistics

Scoring leaders 
 
Updated as of the end of the playoffs.
GP = Games played; G = Goals; A = Assists; Pts = Points; +/– = Plus/minus; PIM = Penalty minutes

Leading goaltenders 
These are the leaders in GAA and save percentage among goaltenders who played at least 40% of the team's minutes. The table is sorted by GAA, and the criteria for inclusion are bolded. Updated as of the end of the playoffs.

GP = Games played; TOI = Time on ice (minutes); GA = Goals against; SO = Shutouts; Sv% = Save percentage; GAA = Goals against average

Elitserien awards

Suspensions and fines

See also 

 2013 Kvalserien
 List of SHL seasons
 2012 in ice hockey
 2013 in ice hockey

References

External links

 
2012-13
1
Swe